The following is a list of armed conflicts with victims in 2016.

The Heidelberg Institute for International Conflict Research estimated that there were 226 politically motivated armed conflicts (of which 38 estimated as highly violent: 18 full-scale wars, 20 limited wars) worldwide during 2016.

List guidelines 
Listed are the armed conflicts having done globally at least 100 victims and at least 1 victim during the year 2016.

10,000+ deaths in 2016
Conflicts in the following list have caused at least 10,000 direct violent deaths in 2016.

1,000–9,999 deaths in 2016
Conflicts in the following list have caused at least 1,000 and fewer than 10,000 direct violent deaths in 2016.Conflicts causing at least 1,000 deaths in one calendar year are considered wars by the Uppsala Conflict Data Program.

100–999 deaths in 2016
Conflicts in the following list have caused at least 100 and fewer than 1,000 direct violent deaths in 2016.

Fewer than 100 deaths in 2016
Conflicts in the following list have caused at least 1 and fewer than 100 direct violent deaths in 2016.

See also

References
Notes

Citations

External links
Major Episodes of Political Violence 1946–2014 – List of armed conflicts compiled by Dr. Monty G. Marshall, director of the Center for Systemic Peace, based on research sponsored by the Political Instability Task Force.
UCDP Conflict Encyclopedia  – Uppsala Conflict Data Program of the Department of Peace and Conflict Research at Uppsala University.
Armed Conflicts Report Interactive Map, by Project Ploughshares.
Global Conflict Tracker, by the Council on Foreign Relations.
CrisisWatch – Monthly bulletin, interactive map and database on ongoing conflicts by the International Crisis Group.
Map of the world's conflicts, by IRIN.
Global Security coverage of ongoing wars
Wars in the world
History Guy's coverage of 21st century wars
Heidelberg Institute for International Conflict Research (HIIK)
Conflict Barometer – Describes recent trends in conflict development, escalations, and settlements
Insight on Conflict – Database on peace-building initiatives in areas of conflict

2016
2016